Please Don't Eat the Daisies (New York: Doubleday, 1957) is a best-selling collection of humorous essays by American humorist and playwright Jean Kerr about suburban living and raising four boys. The essays do not have a plot or through-storyline, but the book sold so well it was adapted into a 1960 film starring Doris Day and David Niven. The film was later adapted into a 1965-1967 television series starring Patricia Crowley and Mark Miller. Kerr followed up this book with two later best-selling collections, The Snake Has All the Lines and Penny Candy.

Contents

Introduction 
The introduction serves as yet another humorous essay, as Kerr describes how she came to be a writer.

Please Don’t Eat the Daisies 
Kerr begins the book with her take on parenting four small boys.

How To Be a Collector’s Item 
The trials and tribulations of an author who hopes her letters are being collected for future publication.

Greenwich, Anyone? 
Kerr's take on the popular trend of writers moving to the country to reconnect with nature.

How To Decorate in One Easy Breakdown 
Kerr gives her own helpful hints on how to redecorate on a budget.

Dogs That Have Known Me 
The author's experiences with dogs, large and small, through the years.

The Kerr-Hilton 
One of the principal sources for the later film, this essay tells how Kerr and her husband acquired their house in Larchmont, New York, complete with gargoyles, secret panels, and a 24-bell carillon that played the duet from Carmen at noon.

The Care and Feeding of Producers 
How to survive getting a play produced.

One Half of Two on the Aisle 
Musings from the self-proclaimed most experienced audience member in America.

Don Brown’s Body 
A parody of Stephen Vincent Benet's "John Brown's Body" which mixes in Mike Hammer and gangsters.

Toujours Tristesse 
A take-off of Francoise Sagan's A Certain Smile.

Snowflaketime 
Kerr muses on the state of school productions of holiday shows through the years.

How to Get the Best of Your Children 
Another essay on the joys of parenting.

Where Did You Put the Aspirin? 
Again, Kerr muses on coping with children.

Aunt Jean’s Marshmallow Fudge Diet 
One of many essays Kerr wrote on the subject of diets and dieting.

Operation Operation 
Kerr's take on hospital stays, doctors, nurses, and the need to insist on patients' rights.

Index 
In yet another satirical jab, Kerr included an index in the book, but with only the page numbers from the original magazines in which the pieces appeared.

Reception 
The book achieved the number one spot on The New York Times bestseller list in February, 1958. Kerr's "wryly observant style" reminded Washington Post critic Richard L. Coe of James Thurber, E. B. White, and Cornelia Otis Skinner.

Kirkus Reviews notedFunny and refreshing, her maternal moments will find a sympathetic hysteria among others bedeviled by strident striplings and a perfect antidote toward accepted currently child raising programs: her take-offs, of Sagan, in Don Brown's Body, and her incisive words on writers (like E. B. White – leve majesti indeed) who move to the country – these are gifted and good.<p>Each short piece, from the introduction to the index, is loaded with laugh-out-loud-remarks, situations and ideas.

Adaptations 
In 1960, Metro-Goldwyn-Mayer released a film adapted from the book, directed by Charles Walters with a screenplay by Isobel Lennart. It starred Doris Day, David Niven, Janis Paige, Spring Byington, Richard Haydn, Patsy Kelly, and Jack Weston. A storyline was created for the film, involving Day as a housewife married to a newly hired New York drama critic (Niven). In his first assignment, he must review a new show produced by his best friend, and he is forced to pan it. Meanwhile, a search for a new home for the family leaves Day dealing with the kids, carpenters, decorators, and the new neighbors by herself.

The film was in turn adapted as a television series that ran from 1965 to 1967 (58 half-hour episodes) starring Patricia Crowley and Mark Miller.

References

External links 
 
 Please Don't Eat the Daisies TV Series
 Please Don't Eat the Daisies at Amazon.com

1957 books
Comedy books
Doubleday (publisher) books
Essay collections
Non-fiction books adapted into films